Sharon Monplaisir (born November 3, 1960) is an American foil fencer. She competed at the 1984, 1988 and 1992 Summer Olympics. She was also on the gold-winning United States fencing team at the 1987 and 1991 Pan American Games, and was a four-time NCAA All-American fencer.

Monplaisir is the subject of children's non-fiction chapter book, Sword of a Champion by Doreen and Michael Greenberg, in the Anything You Can Do... series from Wish Publishing.

References

External links
 

1960 births
Living people
American female foil fencers
Olympic fencers of the United States
Fencers at the 1984 Summer Olympics
Fencers at the 1988 Summer Olympics
Fencers at the 1992 Summer Olympics
Sportspeople from New York City
Pan American Games medalists in fencing
Pan American Games gold medalists for the United States
Fencers at the 1987 Pan American Games
Fencers at the 1991 Pan American Games
21st-century American women
Medalists at the 1987 Pan American Games
Medalists at the 1991 Pan American Games